Rodolfo Louis Fernandes,  from Bondir, Santa Cruz, is an Indian politician representing St. Cruz (Goa Assembly constituency) in the state of Goa, India. 

He started seeking state office in 2012 in the state legislature as an independent and embraced the INC when the opportunity was available in 2022. Rodolfo was elected to Goa State Legislature in 2022. Rodolfo is the son of late former Santa Cruz MLA Victoria Fernandes.  Victoria served for the Santa Cruz Constituency from 1994 through 2012, initially as an Independent and subsequently represented the Indian National Congress from 1997. She was denied the seat in 2012, and Indian National Congress gave the seat to Atanasio Monserrate, who represented the Taleigao constituency from, 2007-2012.  Jennifer Monserrate, wife of Atanasio was given the Taleigao constituency seat in 2012.

Political career
In 2012, at Rodolfo Louis Fernandes' initial attempt he ran as an Independent, a seat held by his late mother Victoria Fernandes and lost to Atanasio Monserrate of INC by a margin of 2336 votes which was 10.93% of the total votes polled.  Monserrate was barred from Indian National Congress for anti-party activities in 2015. Subsequently, Atanasio jumped ship to BJP.

In 2017, Rodolfo ran for a second time again as an Independent and lost to Antonio Fernandes of INC, in a field of eight candidates.  The winner of this contest was Antonio with 6202 votes.  Hemant Golatkar and Rodolfo Fernandes, procured 5560 and 5262 votes respectively of the 22,215 total votes.  Antonio Fernandes switched from INC to BJP in 2019.  Antonio was denied the INC party seat in 2022.

In 2022, Rodolfo Fernandes, ran for the third time but now as Indian National Congress candidate.  This seat was held by his mother late former Goa MLA Victoria Fernandes.  The political patience was rewarded in 2022.  Rodolfo Fernandes defeated Antonia Fernandes who had switched to BJP mid stream.  Rodolfo procured 8841 votes to Antonio 6377.

Personal life
Rodolfo Louis Fernandes was born to Andre Francisco Xavier Romao Franandes and Victoria Fernandes, in Santa Cruz, Goa. Rodolfo completed his Xth from Santa Cruz High School and went on to complete his XIIth from Dhempe College of Art and Science, Mirmar Panaji. He is married and has three children. The Fernandes family are Roman Catholics.

References

Former members of Indian National Congress from Goa
People from North Goa district
Goa MLAs 2022–2027
Year of birth missing (living people)
Living people
Bharatiya Janata Party politicians from Goa